Alfred W. Smith (1864 - 1933) was an American architect. He designed many commercial and residential buildings as well as churches in the Bay Area of California. For example, he designed the  San Francisco Korean Methodist Church in 1930, the Theophilus Allen House in Palo Alto (which is listed on the National Register of Historic Places), and several fraternity houses near the campus of the University of California, Berkeley.

References

1864 births
1933 deaths
People from Berkeley, California
Architects from California
20th-century American architects